Roosevelt Oyola (born April 6, 1991 in El Guabo Canton) is an Ecuadorian footballer. He currently plays for Club 9 de Octubre in the Campeonato Ecuatoriano de Fútbol.

Career
Oyola began playing football in the Spanish club Elche CF's youth system. He made his professional debut with his home country's Barcelona.

Teams
 Barcelona S.C. 2011-2019
 → Deportivo Cuenca (loan) 2014
 9 de Octubre 2020–present

References

1991 births
Living people
People from El Oro Province
Ecuadorian footballers
Barcelona S.C. footballers
C.D. Cuenca footballers
Association footballers not categorized by position